Emma Flower Taylor Mansion is a historic home located at Watertown in Jefferson County, New York. It was built in 1896–1897 and is a massive -story mansion constructed of rock faced, random course Medina sandstone which was hand-cut on site. It is Queen Anne in style and features wraparound porches, towers, projecting bays, dormers, and a complex roofline. It was constructed as a wedding gift to his daughter by New York Governor Roswell Pettibone Flower.

It was listed on the National Register of Historic Places in 2002.

Gallery

References

External links

Houses on the National Register of Historic Places in New York (state)
Queen Anne architecture in New York (state)
Houses completed in 1897
Houses in Jefferson County, New York
National Register of Historic Places in Watertown, New York